Kivu was the name for a large "region" in the Democratic Republic of the Congo under the rule of Mobutu Sese Seko that bordered Lake Kivu. It included three "Sub-Regions" ("Sous-Régions" in French): Nord-Kivu, Sud-Kivu and Maniema, corresponding to the three current provinces created in 1986. The capital of the Kivu Region was in Bukavu, and the capitals of the three Sub-Regions were in Goma, Uvira and Kindu.

Kivu has been repeatedly subjected to major conflicts since the early 20th century. Under Belgian colonial rule, it was the site of several religious revolts such as the 1944 Kivu uprising. Following independence, it was a battleground of the Simba rebellion, First Congo War, and Second Congo War, and has been the site of an ongoing military conflict since the early 2000s. In addition, an Ebola epidemic affected the region from August 2018 to June 2020.

Geography
Kivu is also the name for the entire region surrounding Lake Kivu, including the portions in Rwanda which contain the vast majority of the lake area's population (the contiguous towns of Goma in the Democratic Republic of Congo and Gisenyi in Rwanda, with a combined population approaching 1,000,000, form the largest urbanised area in the Lake Kivu area). The area is characterized by lush vegetation and an extended growing season due in part to its high elevation (1500 m or 4900 ft at the lakeshore) and the volcanic nature of its soil. The Kivu region represents the high point of the East African Rift Valley.

The lake itself contains a massive amount of carbon dioxide in its depths, and there is some concern that tectonic activity (rifting) and/or volcanic activity might cause a limnic eruption, a sudden release of this captured carbon dioxide. If this were to happen it would devastate the population around the lake; however, the likelihood of this occurring is in dispute.

Approximate correspondence between historical and current provinces

References

Geography of the Democratic Republic of the Congo
Former subdivisions of the Democratic Republic of the Congo
Regions of Africa by country
Regions of Africa